In machining, the rake angle is a parameter used in various cutting processes, describing the angle of the cutting face relative to the workpiece. There are three types of rake angles: positive, zero or neutral, and negative.

 Positive rake: A tool has a positive rake when the face of the cutting tool slopes away from the cutting edge at inner side.
 Zero rake: A tool has a zero (or neutral) rake when the face of the cutting tool is perpendicular to the cutting edge at inner side.
 Negative rake: A tool has a negative rake angle when the face of the cutting tool slopes away from the cutting edge at outer side.

Positive rake angles generally:
 Make the tool more sharp and pointed.  This reduces the strength of the tool, as the small included angle in the tip may cause it to chip away.  
 Reduce cutting forces and power requirements.  
 Helps in the formation of continuous chips in ductile materials. 
 Can help avoid the formation of a built-up edge.

Negative rake angles generally:
 Increase the strength of the cutting edge. The tool is more blunt.
 Increases the cutting force.
 Increases the power required for a cut.
 Can increase friction, resulting in higher temperatures.
 Can improve surface finish.

Zero rake angles:
 Easier to manufacture.
 Easier to resharpen.
 Less power and cutting forces than a negative raked tool.
 Chip will wear and 'crater' the rake face.

Recommended rake angles 
Recommended rake angles can vary depending on the material being cut, tool material, depth of cut, cutting speed, machine, setup and process. This table summarizes recommended rake angles for: single-point turning on a lathe, drilling, milling, and sawing.

References

Cutting tools
Metalworking terminology